Dione Orrom is an Grammy and Emmy nominated American Producer and Director. She is known for her work like The Three Tenors Christmas.

References

Living people
Year of birth missing (living people)
American women television producers